Koninklijke Hockey Club Leuven, commonly known as KHC Leuven or simply Leuven, is a Belgian field hockey club based in Heverlee in Leuven, Flemish Brabant.

Honours

Men
Belgian Hockey League
 Winners (1): 2007–08
EuroHockey Cup Winners' Trophy
 Winners (1): 2000
 Runners-up (1): 1997

Women
Belgian Hockey League
 Winners (5): 1992–94, 1995–96, 1996–97, 1997–98, 1998–99

Current squad

Men's squad

References

External links

 
Leuven
Leuven
Sport in Leuven
1929 establishments in Belgium